Patrick Charpentier (born June 18, 1970) is a French boxer who had a boxing record of 27 wins, five losses, and one draw. He had 23 knockouts.

Charpentier began boxing in 1989 and held two titles: the French welterweight title and the European Boxing Union welterweight title.

His biggest fight of his career came against Oscar De La Hoya for the World Boxing Council welterweight title on June 13, 1998. De la Hoya defeated him by third-round knockout in Charpentier's final fight.

External links
 

Living people
1970 births
French male boxers
Welterweight boxers